Power 102.1 RFM (DYRY 102.1 MHz) is an FM station owned by Gold Label Broadcasting System and operated by Ruiz Development Corporation of former Municipal SB Member Beverly "Berly" Ruiz. Its studios and transmitter are located along Naranghita St., Brgy. Poblacion, Mabinay.

References

External links
RFM FB Page

Radio stations in Negros Oriental
Radio stations established in 2014